C.H. Robinson is an American Fortune 200 provider of multimodal transportation services and third-party logistics (3PL). For 2021, it was ranked 5th in the world and 1st in the US among third-party logistics providers by gross logistics revenue/turnover. The company offers freight transportation, transportation management, brokerage and warehousing. It offers truckload, less than truckload, air freight, intermodal, and ocean transportation.

Company overview 
The company is headquartered in Eden Prairie, MN, with more than 300 offices and over 15,000 employees in North America, Europe, Asia, and South America. The company has contractual relationships with over 66,000 transportation companies, including motor carriers, railroads, air freight, and ocean carriers. The company also provides services including supply chain analysis, freight consolidation, core carrier program management, and information reporting. C.H. Robinson also has a brand, Robinson Fresh, through which it engages in buying, selling, and marketing fresh produce and products. Robinson Fresh buys and sells fresh produce to grocery retailers, restaurants, produce wholesalers, and foodservice distributors through a network of independent produce growers and suppliers.

C.H. Robinson handled 14.3 million shipments and worked with more than 46,000 customers in 2014. C.H. Robinson's transportation of goods accounts for about 94% of its gross net revenues with the remainder coming from sourcing and marketing fresh produce.

Workplace & employer accolades 

The company has consistently been recognized for its workplace and employee benefits, and was named the No. 2 Large Company in the 2014 Best Places to Work ranking by the Minneapolis/St. Paul Business Journal. C.H. Robinson has been named a Top 10 Large Company in Minneapolis/St. Paul Business Journal’s Best Places to Work rankings every year since 2006. In 2013, the company earned a spot on Top Workplaces’ Top 150–National Top Workplaces 2013. The Star Tribune has recognized C.H. Robinson as a Top Workplace in several of the past 10 years, and in 2014 recognized the company as a “workplace achiever.”

The company’s work with nonprofits and other charity and community causes has also earned numerous recognitions, including selection as a finalist for the Minnesota Business Magazine 2015 Long-Term Achievement Award for “demonstrating a long-term commitment (at least 10 years) to positively impacting the state’s community of nonprofits or other worthy causes.” In 2014, Minnesota Business Magazine awarded its Workplace Giving Campaign Award to C.H. Robinson. The company also received a Hunger Hero Award from Second Harvest Heartland in 2014, recognizing C.H. Robinson’s “compassionate and transformational impact on those who are hungry in the heartland.”

History

Origins and early history 
In the early 1900s, Charles Henry Robinson owned a small wholesale brokerage house that provided produce throughout North Dakota and Minnesota. He partnered with the Nash brothers on April 11, 1905, and became the company’s first president. Nash Finch Company was the leading wholesaler in the region, owning and operating grocery stores. Following Charles Henry Robinson’s death in 1909, the Nash Brothers assumed control of the C.H. Robinson Company.

C.H. Robinson became the procurement arm for Nash Finch Company as it rapidly expanded in Iowa, Minnesota, Wisconsin, Illinois, and Texas. In the 1940s, the FTC found Nash Finch Company to have a price advantage, and under the Robinson-Patman Act of 1936, C.H. Robinson Co. was split into two companies. The first, C.H. Robinson Co., was formed by the offices that sold produce to Nash Finch’s warehouses, and ownership was retained by C.H. Robinson employees. The second company, C.H. Robinson, Inc., was still owned by Nash Finch.

Expansion into logistics and trucking 
C.H. Robinson’s entry into the trucking business came after the Federal Highway Act of 1956 expanded interstate commerce and the roadways of America. C.H. Robinson and other shippers had previously relied on trains to transport goods. In 1968, the firm entered the regulated truck business as a contract carrier named Meat Packers Express based in Omaha, Nebraska. Robco Transportation Inc. was formed by merging Meat Packers Express with additional carriers three years later and was sold in 1986.

In the mid-1960s, C.H. Robinson Co. and C.H. Robinson, Inc., consolidated their operations under the name C.H. Robinson Co. Nash Finch still held a 25% stake in the brokerage company, with C.H. Robinson employees owning the remainder. By 1976, the Nash Finch shares had been bought out and the company was 100% employee owned. C.H. Robinson focused on using emerging technology, and adopted IBM mainframes in 1979.

The Motor Carrier Act of 1980 deregulated transportation industries in America and increased competition for logistics providers and shippers. C.H. Robinson created a contract carrier program, expanded its freight contract operations, and established itself as a middleman sourcing operation for virtually all shippable goods. The company’s average annual growth, measured by truckloads, more than doubled and C.H. Robinson posted more than $700 million in sale within five years. Forty per cent was generated by truck brokerage, with the remainder of revenue coming from produce sales.

Renaming and IPO 
The company renamed itself C.H. Robinson Worldwide, Inc., in 1997 and had an IPO that raised $190 million for the 101 employees who sold their shares. The initial market value totaled $743 million, and the firm began trading on NASDAQ under the symbol CHRW. Gross revenues for 1997 reached $1.79 billion, while net revenues amounted to $206 million, a 15.1% increase over the previous year.

Acquisitions 
Beginning in 1989, C.H. Robinson began expanding its international logistics operations with the opening of its Monterrey, Mexico office. It acquired C.S. Greene International in 1992 to add international freight forwarding, air freight operations, and refrigerated containers. In 1993, C.H. Robinson bought a 30% stake in Transeco, a major French motor carrier, and eventually bought the entire company. C.H. Robinson enhanced its operations by purchasing companies including Daystar International, a distributor of fruit juice, and FoodSource. It also became an exclusive marketer for Tropicana, Motts, Glory and Welch’s.

The company continued expanding its logistics services by purchasing regional logistics firms like the Chicago-based American Backhaulers, Inc., for $136 million in 1999. Also acquired the Minnesota-based Trans-Consolidated Inc.

At the end of the 1990s, the company began making targeted acquisitions to broaden its global presence and position it to better deliver shipping and logistics services in international markets. These acquisitions include: Preferred Translocation Systems; the Argentina-based Comexter Group; the Western European transportation provider Norminter; New York-based Vertex Transportation Inc.; Smith Terminal International Services, one of the largest third-party logistics providers in Florida; the Germany-based international freight logistics provider Frank M. Viet GmbH Internationale Spedition; Dalian Decheng Shipping Agency Co.; FoodSource Procurement LLC; Apreo Logistics S.A.; and other major European, Indian, Chinese, and North American logistics providers.

In 2012, C.H Robinson purchased Phoenix International for $635 million and doubled its ocean freight capacity. The company also acquired the Polish shipping firm Apreo Logisitics S.A., which provides trucking, air, and ocean shipping services throughout Europe.

The company launched a technology-enabled platform called Navisphere in 2012. The service provides facilities to  C.H. Robinson employees, customers, and service providers to manage supply chain logistics, transportation, and sourcing activities on a global scale.

TMC, a division of C.H. Robinson, provides support for C.H. Robinson’s network through its Managed TMS a combination of global transportation management system (TMS) software and logistics process management.

To connect its shipping and logistics services with the global e-commerce market and expand its opportunities in less than truckload markets, the company acquired Freightquote, a privately owned online transportation broker that provides shipping rate comparisons for national and regional freight carriers, in 2015.

C.H. Robinson acquired Prime Distribution Services on January 28, 2020, for $225 million. The acquisition gave the company services in retail consolidation, including distribution, fulfillment, and inventory management, totaling 2.6 million square feet of warehousing.

See also

 Reeves v. C.H. Robinson Worldwide, Inc.

References

External links

Transport companies established in 1905
Companies based in Eden Prairie, Minnesota
Grand Forks, North Dakota
Logistics companies of the United States
Outsourcing companies
Companies listed on the Nasdaq
Companies in the Dow Jones Transportation Average
Container shipping companies
1905 establishments in North Dakota
1997 initial public offerings
Transportation companies based in Minnesota
Transportation companies based in North Dakota